The anime series Princess Knight is based on the manga series of the same name written by Osamu Tezuka. The series is co-directed by Tezuka, Chikao Katsui and Kanji Akabori, and produced by Mushi Production. The episodes follow Sapphire, a girl who pretend to be a male prince to prevent the criminal Duke Duralumon to inherit the throne of the reign. She experiences many adventures along with Choppy (Tink), the angel who gave her two hearts—a blue one of a boy and a pink of a girl.

Princess Knight was broadcast between April 2, 1967, and April 7, 1968, on Fuji Television. The 52 episodes were later released on LaserDisc by Pioneer on March 28, 1997. The episodes were also distributed in DVD format; Nippon Columbia released two box sets on December 21, 2001, and June 1, 2002. A single box set was released by Columbia on July 23, 2008, and another was released by Takarashijima on October 29, 2010.

After NBC Enterprises's decline Joe Oriolo purchased its distribution rights, and dubbed it to English in 1972; three episodes were made it into a film titled Choppy and the Princess that was syndicated in the United States in the 1970s and 1980s. The show also aired in Australia, and was released on home media in the United Kingdom. Nozomi Entertainment released two DVD box sets on August 20, 2013, and October 22, 2013, respectively.

The series use three pieces of theme music: two opening themes and a single ending theme.

The musics used in original Japanese films including opening themes and ending theme were composed by Isao Tomita.

Episode list

References

Princess Knight